"Aashiqui Aa Gayi" is an Indian Hindi-language song sung by Arijit Singh and composed by Mithoon from the 2022 soundtrack album Radhe Shyam of the film of the same name, starring Prabhas and Pooja Hegde. The song is written by Mithoon. The song was released on 1 December 2021. The music video for the song was released on the same day under the music label T-Series.

Release 
The teaser of the song was released on 29 November 2021. The music video was released on 1 December 2021, by T-Series. The lyrical was released on 19 December 2021 and the audio of the song was released on 23 December 2021. The song was made available at iTunes the same day of release and for online streaming at JioSaavn and Gaana on 1 December 2021.

Music video 
The music video features Prabhas and Pooja Hegde. The video shows Vikramaditya (Prabhas) take Prerana (Pooja Hegde) on bike rides, beach strolls at various locations with matching outfits, creating a dream sequence like feel. The song gives a look at the chemistry between them.

Filming 
The music video of the song is shot in Italy, the song's visuals are filled with scenery of lush green mountains tops, beach, rainbow or a wrecked plane on a deserted spot. Some parts of song was shot at -2° C in snow rain.

Reception

Audience response 
Upon the release of the song, it gained lots of appreciation for its music and choreography. Pooja Hegde's grace and style in the song was appreciated by many.

Critical reviews 
The Indian Express praised the song and stated that perfect as a couple in love. News18 said that fairytale romance. Latestly stated that soothing love track and an absolute visual treat.

Records 
The song crossed more than 22 million views within 24 hours and became the 1st most viewed video song in the first 24 hours of its release. Apart from trending worldwide, it was trended at fourth position on YouTube (India) for several days. The song became a hit with approximately 40 million views on YouTube within 10 days of release. The song has many plays on many music-streaming services, especially on Spotify, Amazon Music, Gaana, JioSaavn, etc.

Music credits 
Credits adapted from T-Series.

 Mithoon – composer, lyrics, programmer, arranger
 Arijit Singh – vocals
 Dilshaad Shabbir Shaikh – additional vocals
 Sahil Solanki – additional vocals
 Munawwar Ali – additional vocals
 Dilshaad Shabbir Shaikh – vocals supervision
 Eric Pillai – mixing, mastering [at Future Sound Of Bombay]
 Michael Edwin Pillai – assistance mixing, assistance mastering
 Anugrah – creative supervision
 Kalyan Baruah – guitars
 Bobby Shrivastava – drums
 Eli Rodrigues – recording engineer
 Kaushal Gohil – musicians co-ordinators, studio assistance

Nagumomu Thaarale (Telugu version) 

"Nagumomu Thaarale" is an Indian Telugu-language song by singer Sid Sriram and composed by Justin Prabhakaran from the 2022 soundtrack album Radhe Shyam of the film of the same name. The song is written by Krishna Kanth. The song was released on 2 December 2021. The music video of the song was released on the same day.

Release 
The teaser of the song was released on 29 November 2021. The song was scheduled to release on 1 December 2021, but due to the passing of lyricist Sirivennela Seetharama Sastry, it was released on 2 December 2021, by T-Series.

Track listing 
The track was released as "Nagumomu Thaarale" in Telugu (lyrics written by Krishna Kanth), "Thiraiyoadu Thoorigai" in Tamil (lyrics written by Madhan Karky), as "Naguvantha Thaareye" in Kannada (lyrics written by Dhananjay Ranjan) and as "Malarodu Saayame" in Malayalam (lyrics written by Joe Paul) languages with vocals by Sid Sriram for Telugu and Tamil while Sooraj Santhosh sung the Kannada and Malayalam version of this track.

 Digital downloads

 "Aashiqui Aa Gayi" (Hindi) - 4:20
 "Nagumomu Thaarale" (Telugu) - 4:54
 "Thiraiyoadu Thoorigai" (Tamil) - 4:54
 "Naguvantha Thaareye" (Kannada) - 4:54
 "Malarodu Saayame" (Malayalam) - 4:54

References

External links 

 
 

2021 songs
Telugu film songs
Hindi film songs
Arijit Singh songs
Songs written by Mithoon
Macaronic songs